Colocation or collocation may refer to:

 Colocation (business), the placement of several entities in a single location
 Colocation centre, a data center where companies can rent equipment, space, and bandwidth for computing services, known as colocation services
 Collocation, in corpus linguistics, a sequence of words that often occur together
 Collocation, a sub-type of phraseme
 Collocation method, used in mathematics to solve differential and integral equations

Technology and engineering
 Co-location (satellite), the placing of two or more geostationary communications satellites in orbit in close proximity
 Collocation (remote sensing), matching remote sensing measurements from two or more different instruments